Tristar or TriStar (meaning "three star") may refer to:

TriStar media organizations
 Columbia TriStar Home Video, a home video production known as Sony Pictures Home Entertainment
 Columbia TriStar Television, a television production/distribution studio now known as Sony Pictures Television
 TriStar Music, a record label owned by Sony BMG
 TriStar Pictures, a film production/distribution cinema studio owned by Sony
 TriStar Productions, a film and television production company
 TriStar Television, a production studio reformed in 2015
 Tri-Star Video, a video production studio known as Sony Pictures Home Entertainment

Arts and entertainment
 Tristar (band), a Kazakh pop music band
 Tristar (film), a 1996 Hong Kong film directed by Tsui Hark
 Tristar 64, an add-on for the Nintendo 64 game console
 Tri-star, an add-on for the Super NES game console, see Super 8

Other uses
 Tri-star (wheel arrangement), a design for climbing over obstructions or stairs
 TriStar Greenview Regional Hospital
 Tristar Gym, a mixed martial arts training centre in Montreal
 TriStar Motorsports, an American stock car racing team
 Tristar Productions, a sports memorabilia company
 Tristar and Red Sector Incorporated, a demogroup formed in 1990
 Tristar Worldwide, a British private hire company
 Tristar or three stars in Japanese; see 
 Lockheed L-1011 TriStar, a widebodied airliner
 Lockheed TriStar (RAF), L-1011-based tankers used by the Royal Air Force
 A strawberry cultivar
 A common nickname for the Flag of Tennessee

See also
Three star (disambiguation)
Columbia TriStar (disambiguation), various uses